Pedro Luis Serrano was a Spanish sailor who was supposed to have been marooned for seven or eight years in the sixteenth century on a small desert island.  Details of the story differ, but the most common version has him shipwrecked on a small island in the Caribbean off the coast of Nicaragua in 1520s. He had no access to fresh water and lived off the blood and flesh of sea turtles and birds and was insane by the time he was rescued.

The tale of Serrano may have been loosely based on the historical case of "Maestre Joan", who stranded on cay of what is now named Serrana Bank in 1528, and was rescued eight years later.

The name Serrana Bank first appears on a Dutch map of 1545.  Other versions place the events in the Pacific off the coast of Peru as late as the 1540s.  There is some doubt about the historicity of the tale.  The earliest known source is Garcilaso de la Vega's Comentarios Reales de los Incas  (1609).

Further reading

References

External links
 Trivia Library feature on Serrano

Year of birth missing
Year of death missing
Castaways
16th-century Spanish people